Hispanic American Studies may refer to:

 Chicana/o studies
 Latin American Studies
 La Raza and La Raza Studies (disambiguation)